In the unconstrained minimization problem, the Wolfe conditions are a set of inequalities for performing inexact line search, especially in quasi-Newton methods, first published by Philip Wolfe in 1969.

In these methods the idea is to find

for some smooth . Each step often involves approximately solving the subproblem

The inexact line searches provide an efficient way of computing an acceptable step length  that reduces the objective function 'sufficiently', rather than minimizing the objective function over  exactly. A line search algorithm can use Wolfe conditions as a requirement for any guessed , before finding a new search direction .

Armijo rule and curvature
A step length  is said to satisfy the Wolfe conditions, restricted to the direction , if the following two inequalities hold:

 

(In examining condition (ii), recall that to ensure that  is a descent direction, we have , as in the case of gradient descent, where , or Newton–Raphson, where  with  positive definite.)

 is usually chosen to be quite small while  is much larger; Nocedal and Wright give example values of 
Inequality i) is known as the Armijo rule and ii) as the curvature condition; i) ensures that the step length  decreases   'sufficiently', and ii) ensures that the slope has been reduced sufficiently. Conditions i) and ii) can be interpreted as respectively providing an upper and lower bound on the admissible step length values.

Strong Wolfe condition on curvature
If we modify the curvature condition to the following,

 

Rationale
The principal reason for imposing the Wolfe conditions in an optimization algorithm where  is to ensure convergence of the gradient to zero.

 

is bounded away from zero and the i) and ii) conditions hold, then .

An additional motivation, in the case of a quasi-Newton method, is that if , where the matrix  is updated by the BFGS or DFP formula, then if  is positive definite ii) implies  is also positive definite.

Comments

Wolfe's conditions are more complicated than Armijo's condition, and a gradient descent algorithm based on Armijo's condition has a better theoretical guarantee than one based on Wolfe conditions (see the sections on "Upper bound for learning rates" and "Theoretical guarantee" 
in the Backtracking line search article).

See also
Backtracking line search

References

Further reading
 
 

Mathematical optimization